The Kingston Hill Murder was the case of Police Constable 356 V Fred Atkins, who was murdered on Kingston Hill, Kingston, Surrey, in 1881.

The murder remains unsolved. The magazine Punch published a cartoon entitled "An Unequal Match" that October highlighting the dangers facing unarmed police. The case was instrumental in bringing about the arming of police officers, although it required a second fatal shooting, that of P.C. George Cole by a burglar, in 1882 and an attempted murder, of P.C. Patrick Boans, in 1883 before the authorities gave superintendents permission to arm their constables for night duty.

Fred Atkins was born in Walton-on-Thames in 1859, the son of a greengrocer, and joined the police in 14 May 1877; 356 Division V (Wandsworth). In 1881 he was lodging with John Pearmain, Inspector Of Police, and his family at the Police Station, Richmond, which was at 35 George Street until 1912. He was transferred from Richmond to Kingston on 15 August.

The murder
On the night of 21 September he was on duty in Kingston Hill, which was not his usual beat. The usual policemen for that beat, PC Andrew Cavanagh, was absent that evening and Atkins was appointed in his place.

The shooting took place in the grounds of The Knoll, a large house with extensive grounds along Kingston Hill next to Richmond Park and opposite Coombe Warren, in the early morning of Thursday, 22 September 1881. The house was owned by Harry Powys-Keck, a Justice Of The Peace of Stoughton Grange, Leicestershire. In that period police officers would check the security of larger residential houses by special request, especially as there had been a series of burglaries in the region; Woodlands, the residence of Miss Finch, which adjoins Mr. Powys Keck's grounds, was broken into on the Tuesday.

The shooting
P.C. Atkins had been in the grounds since at least 1am when he had met one of the gardeners, who had then returned to the lodge and neither he or two grooms in the stables heard the shots. The butler, Mr W Short, was woken at about 1:15am by the sound of crashing and with the housekeeper, Mrs H Snow, who had heard three shots, proceeded to search the house, and found it secure. Mrs Snow told Mr J Bloomfield, the valet, that she had heard moaning. They opened the front door and found the constable lying on the ground. They did not immediately know that he was shot, thinking him in a fit, and placed him on a mat outside and offering him water. Mr Short then sent men running to Kingston Police Station arriving about two o'clock. It was only when they had undone his overcoat that they found that he was wounded.

First to the scene on his horse was Inspector Rushbridge, closely followed by Inspector Crowther with other constables and the ambulance litter. They then sent for Dr. W.H. Roots, the Divisional police surgeon. Atkins could not be taken to the nearest hospital at Surbiton because of his serious condition. Instead he was taken to Kingston Police Station where he was examined by Dr Roots. PC Atkins had been wounded in three places, the abdomen, chest and left thigh. The bullet to the chest had penetrated the lungs; the bullet remained in his back. A second bullet was found at the scene while the third was found in his clothing at the station.

Constable Atkins did not die immediately, and before his death was able to tell colleagues that he neither saw nor heard anything before the shots. "I did not see anybody or hear anything which should me to imagine there were burglars at work. I went along the avenue slowly, accordingly to my usual custom when on duty there, but there was no-one about. Before I was aware of anything I saw something like the gleam of a lantern, and then whispers, after which there was a report, and then I felt I was struck by something sharp in the chest. I turned to one side quickly, when another shot was fired, and that’s all I can remember."

Inspector Bond, with colleagues Crowther and Rushbridge, examined the grounds of The Knoll.  They found that burglars had removed a protective iron bar from a ground floor lavatory window, beneath which in the bushes lay a bull's eye lantern in good condition and a large screwdriver made of an old blacksmith's rasp, taken out of the wooden handle, the top being bound round with a piece of blue check Oxford shirting. The steel had the name of the maker, "W.Peach," and on the flat the initials "F. B."  Footprints were found that led towards Richmond Park.

The murder was committed with a breach-loading, central-fire, six-shot revolver, '450 bore, and Boxer cartridges. The hammer has three cocks—the safety cock, the half-cock, and the full cock.   

  

P.C. Atkins died at halfpast one o'clock on Friday, 23 September, at Kingston Police Station.

The Government offered a reward of £100 for any information leading to the discovery of the murderer and a free pardon to any accomplice. The reward was made up to £200 by donations. The relations of Constable Atkins were entitled to £50 on account of his unexpected death.

The suspect
Local blacksmith and farrier, Frank Brockwell, was arrested and questioned for seven hours. His boots were found to match the footprints in the grounds of the Knoll. The police were forced to release him for lack of evidence.

The inquest

The inquest was carried out at the Clarence Arms, Kingston, on Saturday 24th by Mr. Hall, the Coroner for Mid-Surrey, and concluded on 3 October, the jury giving a verdict that he was wilfully murdered by some person or persons unknown.

The funeral

The funeral took place on Thursday 30 September at Walton-on-Thames municipal cemetery. The headstone was raised by subscription from the Metropolitan Police and general public and was of Sicilian marble.

About 2,000 of the metropolitan police, representing every division, attended the funeral on the 29th September, travelling on a special train from Waterloo to Walton-on-Thames. Also attending were his parents and family and also servants from the Knoll.

Memorials
There is a memorial to him erected in 1996 outside Kingston Police Station. There is a small memorial garden beside the old police station, now the Watchman pub, in New Malden.

Powys-Keck died at the Knoll in 1912; it was sold in 1913, advertised as having 18 acres of grounds with two lodges, forming a miniature park containing its own dairy, kitchen garden and stabling for four horses. In 1914 it was reported that a large new residence was being built, later called Hay Green, for Mr Crowther, "one of the grandest stately homes that once graced Kingston." In 1927 the house was renamed Kingsnympton Hall by Mr F.N. Picket, and later owned by Sir Maneckji B. Dadabhoy of Nagpur, an Indian  industrialist and politician, whose initials "MBD" are on the gates by the lodge. The house was demolished in 1940 after bomb damage.

References

1881 murders in the United Kingdom
History of the Royal Borough of Kingston upon Thames
History of the London Borough of Richmond upon Thames
Murder in London
Murder in Surrey
1880s murders in London